"Sirena" is a Tagalog-language song by Filipino rapper Gloc-9. It was released as the lead single from the rapper's sixth album, MKNM: Mga Kwento Ng Makata. The song features Ebe Dancel, the former vocalist of now defunct Filipino band Sugarfree. This is the 2nd most viewed OPM song on YouTube (reached 11 million views in July 2013), after Gayuma by Abra, also an LGBT related song. Pop band 1:43, mentions "Sirena" as they mention to Kevin Balot, a transgender Filipina.

Composition

The song is about the life of a gay person ("bakla"), from his childhood to his teenage years until the deathbed of his father.

Music video 
The video for "Sirena" was directed by J. Pacena II (who also directed Gloc-9's "Lando", "Balita", "Upuan" among others). The video also features prominent gay personalities like members of the Ladlad Party List such as Danton Remoto and Boy Abunda. The uploaded music video of this song on YouTube reached 2 million views in less than a month. It tells the narration of the events of the song, where the "Sirena" was portrayed by Abner Delina, Jr.

See also 
Gayuma

References

External links 
 Download link (mymusicstore.com.ph)
 Official music video via YouTube

2012 singles
LGBT-related songs
Gloc-9 songs
Universal Records (Philippines) singles
2012 songs
Songs written by Gloc-9
Songs about domestic violence
Songs about child abuse
Tagalog-language songs